Finn Lynch (born 23 April 1996) is an Irish sailor.
He represented Ireland at the 2016 Summer Olympics in the Laser class.	

His best result to date came in 2021, when he placed 2nd at the ILCA 7 Men's World Championship. 

Lynch is currently ranked 3rd in the ILCA 7 men's rankings, as well as being ranked 1st ILCA 7 sailor from Ireland.

References

Irish male sailors (sport)
1996 births
Living people
Olympic sailors of Ireland
Sailors at the 2016 Summer Olympics – Laser